The Pearl City Superfast Express is an overnight Superfast Express train of the Southern Railway zone of the Indian Railways. The Pearl City Superfast Express runs between Thoothukudi and Chennai Egmore via Virudunagar, Madurai, Dindigul, Tiruchchirappalli, Vriddhachalam, Villupuram and Chengalpattu.

Route
The main cities and towns connected by this train are Kovilpatti, Sattur, Virudunagar, Madurai, Dindigul, Tiruchchirappalli, Vriddhachalam, Villupuram and Chengalpattu. The train operates daily and covers a distance of 652 km.

Rolling Stock
Pearl City Superfast Express is running end to end with WAP-7 locomotive from Electric Loco Shed, Erode.

Rakes
The service has all class of coaches in Indian railways like 1 AC First cum Second AC Coach, 2 AC Two-tier coaches, 4 AC Three-tier coaches, 9 Sleeper Coaches, 3 Unreserved and 2 luggage, brake cum generator van.

The Pearl City Express between Chennai Egmore and Thoothukudi has a rake sharing agreement (RSA) with Kanniyakumari Superfast Express between Chennai and Kanniyakumari. The four rakes of the express trains is primary maintenance at Thoothukudi.

Coach Composition 
The train runs consists of 21 carriages:

See also
 Nellai Superfast Express
 Kanniyakumari Superfast Express
 Ananthapuri Express
 Tiruchendur (Chendur) Express
 Cholan Superfast Express
 Pothigai Superfast Express
 Tiruchendur (Chendur) Express
 Pallavan Superfast Express 
 Vaigai Superfast Express 
 Sethu Superfast Express 
 Nilgiri Express 
 Pandian Superfast Express 
 Rockfort (Malaikottai) Superfast Express 
 Chennai Egmore-Nagercoil Weekly Superfast Express 
 Rameswaram (Boat Mail) Express 
 Kovai Express

References

External links
 http://www.indianrail.gov.in

Transport in Thoothukudi
Transport in Chennai
Named passenger trains of India
Express trains in India
Rail transport in Tamil Nadu